"It Matters to Me" is a song written by Ed Hill and Mark D. Sanders and recorded by American country music artist Faith Hill. It was released in November 1995 as the second single and title track from Hill’s second album of the same name (1995). It was her third number one on the Billboard country charts as well as her first entry to the Hot 100.

Critical reception
Wendy Newcomer from Cash Box wrote, "Though she initially patterned herself vocally after heroes like Reba McEntire, Faith Hill seems to be coming into her own style. “It Matters To Me” is a top-notch second single from Hill's sophomore album. Hill has always found her highest chart positions with uptempo songs, but the strength of her performance on this song may secure success with a ballad as well."

Music video
The song's accompanying music video was directed by photographer Randee St. Nicholas.

Charts

Weekly charts

Year-end charts

References

1995 singles
1995 songs
Country ballads
Faith Hill songs
Music videos directed by Randee St. Nicholas
Song recordings produced by Scott Hendricks
Songs written by Ed Hill
Songs written by Mark D. Sanders
Warner Records singles